Netherley may refer to:

 Netherley, Liverpool, an area in Merseyside, England
 Netherley, West Yorkshire, a location in England
 Netherley, Aberdeenshire, a village in Aberdeenshire, Scotland